Glenelg is an unincorporated community in Howard County, Maryland, United States. It is located in the 21737 ZIP Code, and is part of the 410 area code. It is the home town of Glenelg High School.

History
John Dorsey, who was one of the first settlers in what is now Howard County and a prominent man, gave land to his daughter Sarah Dorsey Howard and her husband Henry Howard out in the western part of the county (which is now Glenelg) in 1735.  The property was called Howard's Resolution.  Ephraim Howard, son of Sara and Henry, built a house on the property in the middle or late 18th century. Dr. Ephraim Howard (3.XII.1745-6.XII.1788) matriculated at the University of Edinburgh in 1766 and at the University of Leiden in the Netherlands 7 May 1767. He received his Medical Doctor degree from the University of Leiden on 18 May 1767. The title description of his thesis is: Dissertatio medica inauguralis de variolarum insitione. - Lugduni Batavorum  : apud Theodorum Haak, 1767.

In 1884, an additional section was added on to the front of the house.  The newer front section was built by General Joseph Tyson, Assistant Postmaster General under President John Tyler.  General and Mrs. Tyson called their home "Glenelg" after an old estate in Scotland and "because it spelled the same from either end" — in other words, a palindrome. Although historically not a true manor house, what is today known as "Glenelg Manor" forms the nucleus of a sprawling structure, which houses the Glenelg Country School lower school division. Glenelg Country School is in neighboring Ellicott City.

Discovery Farm was built land patented as "Second Discovery" in 1729. A house was built starting with a kitchen in 1760 with nearby slave quarters. Folly Quarter road was once one of the "Rolling roads" that slaves would roll hogsheads of tobacco toward Elkridge Landing for sale.

A postal village named Glenelg was put in operation on February 6, 1856. The post office served the community out of Browns General store for 133 years until moved into the Ten Oaks shopping center in 1983. By 1878 population increased to 75, with land values ranging from $10 to $30 an acre. In 1915, a Typhoid fever epidemic struck 20 residents, with four deaths.

The Howard Hunt Club ranged throughout the Glenelg area. Future General George S. Patton would travel from Ft. Myer, Va. to hunt along Homewood Road.

Economy 
The economy of Glenelg is primarily driven by commuting professionals working in Baltimore and Washington, DC metro areas, along with a few local restaurants and storefronts. 

The median household income in Glenelg is $195,104.00, making it one of the wealthier communities in the United States.

Community statistics
Zip Code: 21737
Area Code: 410
Population: 1,724
Median household income: $195,104.00
Median home price: $1,012,410
Total Households: 669

See also
Isaacville, Maryland
Ivory, Maryland
Roxbury Mill

References

Unincorporated communities in Howard County, Maryland
Unincorporated communities in Maryland
Dorsey family of Maryland
Leiden University alumni